George Cosmas Adyebo (18 June 1947 – 19 November 2000) was a Ugandan politician and economist who was Prime Minister of Uganda from 1991 to 1994.

Adyebo became Prime Minister on 22 January 1991, succeeding Samson Kisekka, who  became Vice-President. Adyebo served as Prime Minister for nearly four years, until 18 November 1994.

Early life and education 

Adyebo George Cosmas was born on 18 June 1947 at Owiny Village, Nambyeco sub-county, Kwania, Apac to Mr. William Ogwal and Imat Giradeci Acio.

Adyebo joined St. Aloysius College, Nyapea from the then St Pious XII Junior Secondary School Aduku - now called Ikwera Boys, after coming from Abuli Primary School, Nambyeco, where he set an academic record in the 1961 Primary Leavig School Certificate (PLE). No pupil has ever broken the record to date. His former teachers confirm that from Primary one, Adyebo was  promoted to Primary four due to his academic excellence that didn't require him to study in primary two or three.

From an early age, Adyebo already showed signs of leadership among his peers. During his  'O' level at St. Aloysius College Nyapea, he served as the school prefect.
For his  Advanced level of education at Namilyango College, he played football for the then Buganda region. Earlier on he also played football for West Nile District (now Arua, Nebbi, Moyo and Adjumani districts).

After succeeding in his 'A' levels at Namilyango College, he was awarded a scholarship to study at Charles University in Prague. He graduated with a master's degree in Economic Engineering specializing in Mechanization & Automation of Management.

Early career 
From 1976 to 1979, Adyebo worked as the systems Analyst/Programmer with Uganda Computer Services, a department of the Ministry of Finance before he was rapidly promoted and retained by the Ministry of Education.

From 1979 to 1983, Adyebo lectured at Uganda College of Commerce Nakawa currently known as Makerere University Business School. The lectures comprised; Systems Analysis and Design, Computer Programming, Quantitative Analysis as well as Financial Accounting and Management. He equally tutored students who were taking examinations for the Award of Certified and Chartered Accountants (ACCA), Institute of Chartered Managers and Administrators (ICMA) and Institute of Chartered Secretaries and Administrators (ICSA).

After serving as a lecturer at Makerere Business School, he became the principal of Uganda College of Commerce Aduku between 1983 and 1989 - simultaneously serving as a member of Apac District Council V.

Adyebo died on 19 November 2000 at Kampala International Hospital after battling with cancer for several years.

Political career 

The Adyebo was a Member of Parliament for Kwania County upon his death on 19.11.2000. During his political career, Adyebo worked hard to bring change into Uganda's government system and foster economic reform. He left a very strong legacy for (Northern) Ugandans to aspire to. Having come from a very humble background, all his subsequent endeavors reveal a man of exceptional academic brilliance and discipline. His achievements and projects still linger within the hearts of many Ugandans who would not hesitate to endorse his honesty, hard work and exemplary stature in politics. His various roles in Ugandan Politics are highlighted below:

1997–2000: Member of Parliament for Kwania County

1994–1997:  Deputy Speaker of Parliament and Senior Presidential Advisor. In 1995, Adyebo was an elected delegate during the debating and promulgation of the 1995 constitution.

1991–1994: Uganda's Prime Minister preceded by Samson Kiseka and succeeded by Kintu Musoke.

1989: Member of the National Resistance Movement prior to joining the Apac District Council V.

Family 
The Adyebo met his wife Nelly Adyebo during his educational occupation at UCC Aduku. They have four children; Moses Oteng,  Carolyne Acio, Christine  Ayo and Abraham Ogwal.

References 

1947 births
2000 deaths
Prime Ministers of Uganda
People educated at Namilyango College
People from Northern Region, Uganda